The Union County School District is a public school district in Union County, Georgia, United States, based in Blairsville. It serves the communities of Blairsville and Suches.

Schools
The Union County School District has two elementary schools, one middle school, and two high schools.

Elementary schools
Union County Elementary School
Union County Primary School

Middle school
Union County Middle School

High school
Union County High School
Woody Gap High/Elementary School

References

External links

School districts in Georgia (U.S. state)
Education in Union County, Georgia